Ove Ramel (1637 - 29 January 1685) was a Danish landowner.

Biography
Ramel (also written Offue Rommel and Rammel) was the son of Privy Counsellor Henrik Ramel (1601–1653) and Margrethe Skeel (died 1671 or later). He attended Sorø Academy in 1653–1656 and then went abroad to continue his education enrolling at the University of Orléans in 1659. After Denmark's loss of Scania/Skåne to Sweden in 1660, Ramel was naturalized after swearing his loyalty to the Swedish king.

Ramel  married Mette Rosenkrantz (12 March 1646 – 25 January 1730), daughter of Erik Rosenkrantz of Rosenholm (1612–1681) and Margrethe Skeel ( 1626–1647). He was the owner of Bäckaskog and  Ugerup in Scania and Lergrav in Jutland. As the guardian of Kjeld Kristoffer Barnekow. he was also responsible for the management of his estates Vittskövle and Rosendal.

During the Scanian War 1675-79, he went back into Danish service in 1677. His Scanian estates were confiscated and presented to Field Marshall Conrad Marderfelt. Negotiations for the return of his estates and his appointment to landshøvding of Blekinge and Ramel and four other Danish noblemen were in 1678 executed in effigie in the central square 'Stortorget' in Malmö. The doll that represented Ramel was impaled and exhibited by the city gates so as to warn others from fighting the Swedes.

During the war, Ramel served first as General War Commissioner in Kristianstad and from 1678 as county governor of Helsingborg. He played an important role in the small war and for the organisation of resistance groups (snaphaner). He was reported to be popular among the commoners and he also dined with the common soldiers and made friends with lower-ranking officers. Ramel did not take advantage of the amnesty that followed the Peace of Lund but settled in Denmark where he was granted title of  etatsråd.

He was, by marriage, the proprietor of Lergrav. In 1551 he ceded Lergrav to his sister, Anna, the widow of chancellor Peder Reedtz, in exchange for Basnæs on Zealand. In 1682, he also acquired Borreby Castle.

Ramel died on  29 January 1685 at Borreby and was buried at Sorø Abbey Church. Borreby had to be sold as a result of his financial situation. The king granted his widow a pension of 500 daler as compensation for the loss of their Scanian holdings. She sold Basnæs in 1685.

References

External links

 Ove Ramel at geni.com

17th-century Danish landowners
1637 births
1685 deaths